Chilobrachys huahini also known as the Asian fawn, Hauhini bird spider or Hauhini birdeater tarantula is a tarantula which was first described in 1996 by Gunter Schmidt and Siegfried Huber. It is named after Hua Hin, Thailand as it is found there.

Description 
Females live 11 to 12 years, while males live 2 to 4. Their bodies are all around brown, with some darker stripping in the carapace and legs. Males are a bit lighter than the females, though their coloration is still brown.

Habitat 
It is found in Hua Hin, which is home to a tropical savanna climate. With average temperatures of 28ºC, and average yearly rainfall of 955mm. It is home to plants such as Dipterocarpus tuberculatus and Hopea odorata. It is also home to animals such as Gaurs, Asian elephants and Golden Jackals.

Behavior 
It is a terrestrial tarantula, but is also an opportunistic burrower. They are very defensive, and are quite skittish, it is quite fast, and persistent provocation may result in a bite. As they are old world tarantulas, they do own potentially significant venom.

References 

Spiders of Asia
Spiders described in 1996
Theraphosidae